The Christuskirche is a Lutheran Evangelical church in Rome. It was built between 1910 and 1922 under direction of architect Franz Heinrich Schwechten, who also responsible for the Kaiser-Wilhelm-Gedächtniskirche in Berlin.

On 11 December 1983, Pope John Paul II visited the church and participated in an ecumenical service, the first papal visit ever to a Lutheran church. The visit took place 500 years after the birth of Martin Luther, the German Augustinian monk and Protestant Reformer.

On January 14, 2015, Swedish actress Anita Ekberg's funeral Mass was held at Christuskirche.

References

External links 

 Official website of the Evangelisch-Lutherische Gemeinde in Rom

Protestant churches in Rome
Churches completed in 1922
Lutheran churches in Europe
Romanesque Revival church buildings in Italy
Churches of Rome (rione Ludovisi)